The 1993 California Golden Bears football team was an American football team that represented the University of California, Berkeley in the Pacific-10 Conference (Pac-10) during the 1993 NCAA Division I-A football season. In their second year under head coach Keith Gilbertson, the Golden Bears compiled a 9–4 record (4–4 against Pac-10 opponents), finished in a tie for fifth place in the Pac-10, and outscored their opponents by a combined score of 411 to 303.

The team's statistical leaders included Dave Barr with 2,619 passing yards, Lindsey Chapman with 1,037 rushing yards, and Mike Caldwell with 962 receiving yards.

Schedule

Roster
Na'il Benjamin (offense)

Game summaries

vs. Iowa (Alamo Bowl)

References

California
California Golden Bears football seasons
Alamo Bowl champion seasons
California Golden Bears football